Told Slant is a low-fi indie band from Brooklyn. It is led by Felix Walworth, who is non-binary,  and uses they/them pronouns. Walworth is also involved in other projects, including Gabby's World, Florist, and Bellows. David Anthony, writing for The A.V. Club, praised Walworth for their ability to produce "simple, heartbreaking songs".

History
Told Slant was formed at Bard High School Early College where Walworth met Kalb and started playing music together. They released Still Water in 2012, and their sophomore album Going By in 2016. Walworth writes and records all of the parts to the songs, bringing in other members for live performances.

Told Slant was scheduled to play at the 2017 South by Southwest festival but canceled over fears that the festival would aid in deporting foreign artists.

On 15 September 2020 Walworth announced their next album, titled Point the Flashlight and Walk, would be released on 13 November by Double Double Whammy.

Discography

Albums
 Still Water - Self-released (2012)
 Going By - Double Double Whammy (2016)
 Point the Flashlight and Walk - Double Double Whammy (2020)

Live Recordings
 Live At ACRN Ohio University (2014) - Broken World Media

References

Musical groups from Brooklyn
Non-binary musicians
American indie folk groups